Fashion Careers College (FCC) was a for-profit college located in San Diego, California, United States, established to provide a collegiate-level education for students seeking careers in the fashion industry.  
Founded by Patricia O'Connor in 1979, the college closed in January 2013.

Programs 
FCC offered 2-year associate degrees in Fashion Merchandising, Fashion and Fabric Consulting, and Fashion/Apparel Design and one-year certificates in Fashion Merchandising and Fashion/Apparel Design.

Accreditation 
FCC was accredited by the Accrediting Council for Independent Colleges and Schools (ACICS) from 1983 until its closure in 2013. It was also approved by the California Bureau for Private Postsecondary and Vocational Education.

References

Business schools in California
Fashion schools in the United States
Universities and colleges in San Diego
Former for-profit universities and colleges in the United States
Defunct private universities and colleges in California